Deceptions is a 1990 erotic drama film starring Nicollette Sheridan, Harry Hamlin and Robert Davi. It was directed by Ruben Preuss and written by Ken Denbow and Richard Taylor. The film received a nomination for a CableACE Award for "best international dramatic special or movie. AllRovi reviewer Linda Rasmussen called the film, "a remarkably predictable, non-erotic thriller with little to recommend it".

Premise 
A homicide cop falls for a beautiful suspect. When wealthy socialite Adrienne kills her husband Douglas, she claims self-defense. Nick, the cop assigned to the case is suspicious but becomes obsessed with the sensual young woman.

DVD releases
There are no plans to release this movie on DVD.

Sequel
The film was followed by a 1994 sequel titled Deceptions II: Edge of Deception.

References

External links

1990 films
1990s erotic drama films
American erotic drama films
1990 drama films
American drama television films
1990s American films